Felice Bonetto (9 June 1903 in Manerbio, near Brescia, Italy – 21 November 1953 in Silao, Mexico) was a courageous racing driver who earned the nickname Il Pirata (The Pirate).

He was a road racing legend, who started racing in the 1930s, and enjoyed a brief Formula One career, including a win in the non-Championship Grande Premio do Jubileu in 1953. During his Formula One career, he raced Italian cars, starting with a privateer Maserati for Scuderia Milano, then the works Alfa Romeo, and finally the works Maserati, achieving two shared podiums finishes in the World Championship. His greatest successes were in sport cars, winner of the 1952 Targa Florio, but his career and life were cut short when he fatally crashed into a lamp post in the 1953 Carrera Panamericana whilst leading.

Career

Debut and early career
Felice Bonetto was born in Manerbio, which in the province of Brescia, the home of the Mille Miglia. Despite that, he began to race, very young, on motor bikes. The switch to four wheels came very late to modern standards; he, in fact, already 28 when he participated in the Bobbio-Penice, with a Bugatti. Despite having to make do with cars that not always competitive, but the results were not lacking. In 1933, Bonetto was third in the infamous Gran Premio di Monza with an Alfa Romeo 8C 2600. The race will always be remembered as the Black Day of Monza, when three of Europe's greatest racing drivers crashed fatally within a few hours of each other: Giuseppe Campari, Mario-Umberto Borzacchini and Count Stanisław Czaykowski. He also finished second in the Coppa Principessa di Piemonte. A year later he came twelfth in the Mille Miglia, but he obtained his greatest success after World War II. After the World War II abruptly ended his career, as well as that of his colleagues of the time. Bonetto resumed his racing in 1946 with the small Cisitalia, before moving into Formula One.

Formula One
Although Bonetto had raced Formula One cars before, he made his World Championship F1 debut in the 1950 Swiss Grand Prix. He was five days short of his 47th birthday. He entered his own Maserati 4CLT in several Grands Prix, under the Scuderia Milano banner, and drove a works Alfa Romeo SpA in 1951, as their number three driver. He shared a third, with Giuseppe Farina in the Gran Premio d'Italia. A move to sports cars followed, but he returned to Formula One at the end of 1952 and had a good season in the Officine Alfieri Maserati in 1953, with a visit to the podium, when he again shared a third-place finish in the Grote Prijs van Nederland. This time partnered by José Froilán González. Away from the World Championship, Bonetto did have some success; he was second in the 1949 in the Gran Premio di Napoli in a Ferrari.

Ace of sport

More than F1, however, Bonetto had greater success in sports cars. He won the 1947 Circuito de Firenze driving a Delage 3000. In 1949 he was second in the Mille Miglia, behind Clemente Biondetti, both drove a Ferrari 166 MM Touring for Scuderia Ferrari, and in 1950 he won the Pontedecimo-Giovi hillclimb in an Osca and the Gran Premio di Oporto in his own Alfa Romeo.  The following season, he drove for Alfa Romeo's new 1900TI model to class victory in the Giro di Sicilia. Then for 1952, he moved to Scuderia Lancia, and at the wheel of a Lancia Aurelia B20, he finished second on the Giro di Sicilia. He followed this with a sixth place in the Preis von Bremgarten and an eighth in the les 24 Heures du Mans, and finally a great win in the Targa Florio. He continued with the Scuderia Lancia outfit for 1953; claiming third in the Mille Miglia, second in the Gran Premio di Monza, victory in the Grande Premio do Jubileu at the Circuito de Monsanto and he became part of the squadron deployed to the Carrera Panamericana: his teammates for the race were Juan Manuel Fangio, Piero Taruffi, Giovanni Bracco and Eugenio Castellotti.

Death
The Carrera Panamericana, a notoriously dangerous and difficult public road rally in Mexico that took place over 6 days from one end of the North American country to the other, covering a distance of 2,000 miles (3,200 km). It was the last round of the 1953 World Sportscar Championship, and the race started on 19 November 1953, from Tuxtla Gutiérrez; Bonetto won the first stage, in front of his teammates Taruffi, Fangio and Castellotti. Taruffi would win the next two stages, although Bonetto remained in control. The third day of competition, Bonetto and Taruffi were close and continued to duel with each other; the second stage of the day, however, Taruffi went off the road in the foggy area before the small town of Silao, about 25 miles from León, damaging the steering of his Lancia. In the same locality, Bonetto crashed his Lancia against the balcony of a house, ending up against a pole. Bonetto hit his head on the balcony at speed and was killed instantly. Prior to the event, Bonetto with Taruffi and other Italian drivers reportedly marked dangerous corners along the route with blue signs. His accident happened at one of those locations – despite this care in marking the corners, Felice would take a 60 mph corner at 125 mph.
After Bonetto's death, team owner Gianni Lancia wanted to withdraw his cars from the race, but the surviving drivers decided to keep on racing in honour of their teammate. Fangio, Taruffi and Castellotti led to the finish giving Lancia first three places, but it was a success that was not rejoiced, as besides Bonetto the race also claimed the lives of fellow Italian drivers, Antonio Stagnoli and Giuseppe Scotuzzi, as well as six spectators. Bonetto is buried in the Cimitero Italiano section of the Panteón Civil de Dolores, México City.

Bonetto family in the automotive world
The contribution of the Bonetto family to the automotive world did not end with the death of Bonetto. The nephew, Rodolfo Bonetto, was a leading figure in the field of Italian architecture and industrial design. Rodolfo's son, Marco, continued in this field as chairman of Bonetto Design. As for Felice's own son, Roberto Bonetto has dedicated his career to journalism, to become deputy editor of Quattroruote.

Racing record

Career highlights

Complete Formula One World Championship results
(key)

Notes
‡ Shared drive with José Froilán González
† Shared drive with Juan Manuel Fangio

Complete 24 Hours of Le Mans results

Complete Mille Miglia results

Complete Carrera Panamericana results

References

1903 births
1953 deaths
Italian racing drivers
Italian Formula One drivers
Scuderia Milano Formula One drivers
Alfa Romeo Formula One drivers
Maserati Formula One drivers
Racing drivers who died while racing
Sport deaths in Mexico
World Sportscar Championship drivers
Mille Miglia drivers
Carrera Panamericana drivers
24 Hours of Le Mans drivers